Stephen William Paine (October 28, 1908 in Grand Rapids, Michigan – February 9, 1992) was President of Houghton College, and the president of the National Association of Evangelicals from 1948 to 1950.

Biography
He was the son of Stephen Hugh Paine and Mary Wilfrieda (Fischer) Paine. In 1930, he graduated from Wheaton College. In 1933, he began teaching at Houghton College, became Academic Dean in 1935, and was President from 1937 to 1972. In 1940, he ran on the Prohibition ticket for U.S. Senator from New York. He was President of the National Association of Evangelicals from 1948 to 1950.

He helped translate the New International Version of the Bible.

Bibliography
Beginning Greek: A Functional Approach (1961)

References

External links
Houghton College, past presidents

1908 births
1992 deaths
20th-century American academics
20th-century evangelicals
Activists from New York (state)
American evangelicals
Heads of universities and colleges in the United States
Houghton University
New York (state) Prohibitionists
People from Allegany County, New York
People from Grand Rapids, Michigan
Wheaton College (Illinois) alumni